The Van Diemen's Land Company (also known as Van Dieman Land Company) is a farming corporation in the Australian state of Tasmania. It was founded in 1825 and received a royal charter the same year, and was granted 250,000 acres (1,000 km2) in northwest Van Diemen's Land (now Tasmania) in 1826. The company was a group of London merchants who planned a wool growing venture to supply the needs of the British textile industry.

The company established its headquarters at Circular Head under the management of Edward Curr who arrived in Van Diemen's Land in 1826.

Much of the initial cargo, stock and farm labourers arrived in Van Diemen's Land aboard . Some of the settlers refused to adapt to their new surroundings. For instance they did not recognise that in the Southern Hemisphere the seasons were reversed. For many years the costs of farming were only just recovered. By the 1880s the company was making more money from timber felling and timber exports than from farming.

The Van Diemen's Land Company introduced bounties on the thylacine (Tasmanian tiger) from as early as 1830, which was a partial cause of their extinction.

The company was the constructor of the early stages of the Emu Bay Railway between 1875 and 1884.

The company retains some of the original land grant and is widely believed to be the last Australian chartered company still operating. By the 1970s the company owned one seventh of its original selection.

In July 2014 it was announced the owner of the Van Diemen's Land Company, New Plymouth District Council (through Taranaki Investment Management Limited) in New Zealand, was attempting to sell the company. In 2016, Moon Lake Investments, controlled by Lu Xianfeng, purchased it for A$280 million. Moon Lake Investments has since changed its name to Van Dairy Limited. In 2021, 12 farms comprising 2,200 hectares were sold to Prime Value, an asset manager based in Melbourne, for A$62.5 million. Later in 2021, 6,000 hectares in the Woolnorth area were sold to TRT Pastoral Group for over A$120 million.

Citations

References
 Pink, Kerry Winds of Change: A History of Woolnorth (2003)
 James Bischoff, Sketch of the history of Van Diemen's Land, illustrated by a map of the island, and an account of the Van Diemen's Land Company (1832)

Companies established in 1825
History of Australia (1788–1850)
Chartered companies
Companies based in Tasmania
North West Tasmania
1825 establishments in Australia
History of Tasmania
Van Diemen's Land